Michael John Amberg (25 April 1926 – 24 July 2001) was a British fencer. He competed in the individual and team sabre events at the 1960 Summer Olympics.

He also represented England at three Commonwealth Games and won six medals; three gold medals, a silver medal and a bronze medal in the sabre events from 1954 to 1962. He was a three times British fencing champion, winning the sabre title at the British Fencing Championships in 1957, 1958 and 1959.

References

External links
 

1926 births
2001 deaths
British male fencers
Olympic fencers of Great Britain
Fencers at the 1960 Summer Olympics
Sportspeople from London
Commonwealth Games medallists in fencing
Commonwealth Games gold medallists for England
Commonwealth Games silver medallists for England
Commonwealth Games bronze medallists for England
Fencers at the 1954 British Empire and Commonwealth Games
Fencers at the 1958 British Empire and Commonwealth Games
Fencers at the 1962 British Empire and Commonwealth Games
Medallists at the 1954 British Empire and Commonwealth Games
Medallists at the 1958 British Empire and Commonwealth Games
Medallists at the 1962 British Empire and Commonwealth Games